Villa Cornèr della Regina is a Venetian villa started building in 1500 probably under the supervision of Vincenzo Scamozzi, underwent alterations in 1700 by Giovanni Cornèr, bishop of Castelfranco Veneto, who commissioned the architects Giovanni Miazzi, Muttoni and Francesco Maria Preti. The Villa, with the addition of the Palladian style portico, then took on its appearance of today. The "barchesse" outbuildings were also built in the same period.

In 1918, the Villa was occupied by General Enrico Caviglia, commander of the VIII and X army corps. In 1968, Sir Stafford Sands purchased Villa Cornèr from the Orefice family, after which the ex-governor of the Bahamas restored it, adding the current swimming pool and tennis courts. In 1980, an important Venetian family restored the Villa with the "barchesse", the park with 32 statues (works by Orazio Marinali) and 11 hectares of vineyards, taking special care with furnishing the elegant halls and rooms, restoring the villa to its original splendour and atmosphere of the glorious age of the Venetian Republic.

References 

 
Villas in Veneto